Cyclostrema crassiolatum is a species of sea snail, a marine gastropod mollusk in the family Liotiidae.

Distribution
This benthic species occurs in the Southeast Pacific and Antarctic Atlantic Ocean (off South Georgia)

References

 Linse, K. 1999 Mollusca of the Magellan region. A checklist of the species and their distributions. Scientia Marina 63(1):399-407.

External links
 To World Register of Marine Species

crassiolatum
Gastropods described in 1908